Lotte reis lõunamaale is a 2000 Estonian animated film directed by Janno Põldma and Heiki Ernits. The film is one of the Lotte films.

Awards, participations:
 2000: Estonian Film Journalists' Association's award: Neitsi Maali award (best film of the year)
 2000: annual award by Cultural Endowment of Estonia
 2000: SCHLINGEL - International Film Festival for Children and Young Audiences (Chemnitz, Germany), participating

Plot

Cast
 Anu Lamp (narrator, voice)
 Evelin Pang (Lotte, voice)

References

External links
 
 Lotte reis lõunamaale, entry in Estonian Film Database (EFIS)

2000 films
Estonian animated films
Estonian children's films